Maria Matsouka (born 8 January 1974) is a Greek politician and Member of the European Parliament for the Panhellenic Socialist Movement; part of the Party of European Socialists.

References

External links
 

1974 births
Living people
PASOK MEPs
MEPs for Greece 2004–2009
21st-century women MEPs for Greece
Place of birth missing (living people)
People from Aetolia-Acarnania